Chromium(II) acetate hydrate, also known as chromous acetate, is the coordination compound with the formula Cr2(CH3CO2)4(H2O)2. This formula is commonly abbreviated Cr2(OAc)4(H2O)2. This red-coloured compound features a quadruple bond. The preparation of chromous acetate once was a standard test of the synthetic skills of students due to its sensitivity to air and the dramatic colour changes that accompany its oxidation.  It exists as the dihydrate and the anhydrous forms.

Cr2(OAc)4(H2O)2 is a reddish diamagnetic powder, although diamond-shaped tabular crystals can be grown. Consistent with the fact that it is nonionic, Cr2(OAc)4(H2O)2 exhibits poor solubility in water and methanol.

Structure
The Cr2(OAc)4(H2O)2 molecule contains two atoms of chromium, two ligated molecules of water, and four acetate bridging ligands. The coordination environment around each chromium atom consists of four oxygen atoms (one from each acetate ligand) in a square, one water molecule (in an axial position), and the other chromium atom (opposite the water molecule), giving each chromium centre an octahedral geometry. The chromium atoms are joined by a quadruple bond, and the molecule has D4h symmetry (ignoring the position of the hydrogen atoms). The same basic structure is adopted by Rh2(OAc)4(H2O)2 and Cu2(OAc)4(H2O)2, although these species do not have such short M–M contacts.

The quadruple bond between the two chromium atoms arises from the overlap of four d-orbitals on each metal with the same orbitals on the other metal: the dz2 orbitals overlap to give a sigma bonding component, the dxz and dyz orbitals overlap to give two pi bonding components, and the dxy orbitals give a delta bond. This quadruple bond is also confirmed by the low magnetic moment and short intermolecular distance between the two atoms of 236.2 ± 0.1 pm. The Cr–Cr distances are even shorter, 184 pm being the record, when the axial ligand is absent or the carboxylate is replaced with isoelectronic nitrogenous ligands.

History
Eugène-Melchior Péligot first reported a chromium(II) acetate in 1844. His material was apparently the dimeric Cr2(OAc)4(H2O)2. The unusual structure, as well as that of copper(II) acetate, was uncovered in 1951.

Preparation
The preparation usually begins with reduction of an aqueous solution of a Cr(III) compound using zinc. The resulting blue solution is treated with sodium acetate, which results in the rapid precipitation of chromous acetate as a bright red powder.
2 Cr3+ + Zn → 2 Cr2+ + Zn2+
2 Cr2+ + 4 OAc− + 2 H2O → Cr2(OAc)4(H2O)2
The synthesis of Cr2(OAc)4(H2O)2 has been traditionally used to test the synthetic skills and patience of inorganic laboratory students in universities because the accidental introduction of a small amount of air into the apparatus is readily indicated by the discoloration of the otherwise bright red product.  The anhydrous form of chromium(II) acetate, and also related chromium(II) carboxylates, can be prepared from chromocene:
 4 RCO2H + 2 Cr(C5H5)2 → Cr2(O2CR)4 + 4 C5H6
This method provides anhydrous derivatives in a straightforward manner.

Because it is so easily prepared, Cr2(OAc)4(H2O)2 is a starting material for other chromium(II) compounds.  Also, many analogues have been prepared using other carboxylic acids in place of acetate and using different bases in place of the water.

Applications
Chromium(II) acetate has few practical applications. It has been used to dehalogenate organic compounds such as α-bromoketones and chlorohydrins.  The reactions appear to proceed via 1e− steps, and rearrangement products are sometimes observed.

Because the compound is a good reducing agent, it will reduce the O2 found in air and can be used as an oxygen scrubber.

See also
 Chromium(III) acetate
 Chromium acetate hydroxide

References

Further reading

External links

http://www.molecules.org/coordcpds.html#Cr2OAc4H2O
 (outdated)
http://wwwchem.uwimona.edu.jm/courses/chromium.pdf

Chromium(II) compounds
Acetates
Coordination complexes
Reducing agents
Chemical compounds containing metal–metal bonds
Chromium–oxygen compounds